The Robert Sands Estate was a historic home located at Rhinebeck, Dutchess County, New York. The house was built about 1796 and is a -story, brick filled wood-frame building, with a gable roof and sheathed in clapboard. It sat on an extant stone foundation and measured five bays wide by four deep. Also on the property were a contributing -story frame cottage and four frame farm outbuildings, including a Dutch barn.

It was added to the National Register of Historic Places in 1987. In 2015 the National Park Service, which oversees the Register, announced that it was considering a request to remove it as a result of a 1999 fire that left only the foundation. It did so in August of that year.

See also
National Register of Historic Places listings in Rhinebeck, New York

References

Former National Register of Historic Places in New York (state)
Federal architecture in New York (state)
Houses completed in 1796
Houses in Rhinebeck, New York
National Register of Historic Places in Dutchess County, New York
1796 establishments in New York (state)